Mark Leon Robinson (born September 13, 1962) is a former professional American football player. He was a 1982 Consensus All-American safety at Penn State University. He played 9 seasons as a safety in the National Football League (NFL), for the Kansas City Chiefs and Tampa Bay Buccaneers.

Robinson is currently the color analyst for radio broadcasts of University of South Florida Bulls football games. He also co-hosts a Tampa Bay Buccaneer fan show called "Xtra Point" on Spectrum Sports Florida. He also co-owns Safety Harbor Montessori, a private school located in Clearwater, Florida.

References

1962 births
Living people
Players of American football from Washington, D.C.
American football safeties
Penn State Nittany Lions football players
Kansas City Chiefs players
Tampa Bay Buccaneers players
Ed Block Courage Award recipients